Ahmed Umar (born 10 February 1988) is a Sudanese-Norwegian visual artist and LGBT activist who campaigns for gay visibility. Umar grew up in a conservative family in Sudan, before fleeing to Norway where Umar artistic work mixes Sudanese (e.g., the Black Pharaohs of the ancient Kingdom of Kush) and western influences by blending stories as a foundation for the works. Their experience of coming out as one of the first openly gay Sudanese was detailed in the film The Art of Sin.

Early life 
Ahmed Umar was born in Sudan, on the 10th of February 1988, into a traditional Sufi family that lived between Mecca and Sudan.

Moving to Norway 
Umar arrived to Norway in 2008 as a political refugee from Sudan, which at the time was one of seven nations that executed people for same-sex conduct. Umar obtained a bachelor’s degree in Printmaking 2014 from Oslo National Academy of the Arts, followed by a master’s degree in Fine Art.

Umar lives and works in Oslo, and became a renowned artist known for mixing Sudanese (e.g., the Black Pharaohs of the ancient Kingdom of Kush) and western influences by blending stories as a foundation for the works. Umar art involves live performances and work with ceramics, jewellery, and prints. Umar's work has been exhibited at different national and international institutes.

Art and LGBT activism 
In 2015, Umar came out on Facebook as one of the first openly gay man from Sudan, causing a large portion of the Sudanese community to turn against him, including relatives. Umar experience of coming out as one of the first openly gay Sudanese was detailed in the film The Art of Sin. Umar described the experience before coming out in an interview by My.Kali as:I believed that I was cursed and that Allah would punish me with eternal unhappiness, HIV and die like Freddie Mercury, and that I will bring shame to my family. I wanted so badly to die. I was so lonely.  Umar uses personal experiences to discuss queer lives in Sudan and internationally. Umar shared their story writing Pilgrimage of Love chapter in This Arab Is Queer (2022), an anthology written by Arab LGBTQ+ writers.  In an interview, with the Sudanese magazine 500 Words Magazine, about Art and identify where Umar reiterated his believe that ‘there were entirely homosexual groups of men living in the Kingdom of Kush’  which challenges the deep rooted believe that homophobia is entrenched in the Sudanese society.  Other examples are discussed below.

Islam in Umar's Work 
Although Umar is an atheist,  but having grown up in a conservative Islamic environment; Islam and arabic culture plays a role in Umar identity and art . Many of Umar sculptures were inspired by Quran, verse like Would any of you like to eat a dead brothers flesh?,', from Quran Chapter 49 verse 12, became the name of one of their work, and What Lasts! which describes the story of Lot who was sent to the cities of Sodom and Gomorrah as a prophet. UMAR 2016 sculpture titled 'Purification set' shows the tools used for Wudu. 

Umar's Jewelry work Hijab navigate the strong link between religion amulets and superstition  using Sufism tradition and strung together a 365 amulet, one for every day of the year, to protect the wearer from harm and bring luck. Many of Umar's drawings has arabic words and scribbles.

 Sudan in Umar's Work 
Umar's work embrace Sudanese culture, e.g., If you no longer have a family, make your own with clay,  a Sudanese proverb, which deals with Umar's family, epically his father, disowning them after coming out.  In 2018, Umar became a naturalised Norwegian citizen, and attended the citizenship ceremony wearing an outfit that mixes Sudanese and Norwegian cultures, i.e., Identity-Embroidered.

 Carrying the face of ugliness 
Umar popularity grew as the face of Sudanese LGBT community but animosity toward them is also growing. Sudanese saying “carrying the face of ugliness”, is typically used for someone which describes a person who does something unfamiliar, confronts an issue and takes the blame for it. In this case, being gay. Umar completed the photo-shotting for this project in Sudan during filming The Art of Sin with Umar taking photographs with other Sudanese LGBT, but with Umar’s face obscuring theirs. Pictures from the project were made into graffities in Oct. 2022, by Kulturbyrået Mesén, at of Oslo main station, airport station and Ski station.
 Sudanese Revolution 
Umar eternal quest in exploring their own identity and context was further manifested while supporting the Sudanese Revolution through sculpture Thawr, Thawra. In June 2019, Umar joined NYC Pride March wearing Sudanese-inspired outfit.  In 2020, during the Agenda arts and crafts event organised by Oslo National Academy of the Arts, Umar discussed and showed case their arts that deals with the relationship between art and democracy in the context of Sudan and its 30 years dictatorship. In 2021, In God's hand photo project showed the revolutionary women of Sudan, The Kandakas. The Sudanese Revolution carried hope for Umar to live freely in a democratic nation where everyone is valued equally. 

 The Nile Pride 2030 

Umar convinced that there will be a parade in Sudan before they die. Pride for Umar is akin to Christmas or Eid, and that why Umar actively promote The Nile Pride 2030, the pride festival that will take place in Khartoum, Sudan in 2030.  However, in a country where it is virtually impossible to register LGBT organisations,  the objective does not seem to be the event/year but rather spreading awareness and challenging the narrative.

 Awards and honours 

 2021 

 KunstnerLiv documentary show, NRK.
 Nominee for Sandefjord Kunstforening Art Award.

 Artist's work grant, Arts Council Norway.

 2018 

 Young and newly established artist's work grant, Arts Council Norway.

 Atelier Kunstnerforbundet Studio residency.

 NOoSPHERE Artist Residency Award, New York City.

 Scheibler Foundation Art and Craft Award.
2017 Debutante Award, Kunsthånverk, Norske kunst og hånverkers Årsutstilling, National Museum of Decorative Arts, Trondheim.

2016 The Art Student Grant from BKH, The Norwegian Relief Fund for Visual Artists.

 Selected public collections 

2021 What Lasts! (، Sarcophagus), Vestfossen Kunstlaboratorium.

2020 Forbidden Prayer: The Norwegian Ministry of Foreign Affairs (An installation for the embassy of Norway in Khartoum, Sudan).

2019 Thawr, Thawra, The Norwegian National Museum, Oslo.

2019 Hijab to Hannah, National Museum of Decorative Arts, Trondheim.

2017 Hijab (Annual Protection), Oslo Municipality Art Collection.

 Selected work 
2023 Glowing Phalanges: Prayer Beads 99, (planned'') Kunstnernes Hus, Oslo.2022 Solace in Clay, International Academy of Ceramics, UN, Geneva.2021 In God's hand, Ha Gamle Prestegard, Oslo.2020 The Art of Sin a documentary film.2019 If you no longer have a family, make your own with clay, Last Frontier art space, NYC, USA.2017''' Kunsten a være syndig, short documentary film.

Notes

See also 

 Human rights in Sudan
 LGBT rights in Sudan
 LGBT in Islam
 LGBT rights in Africa
 Omeima Mudawi-Rowlings

References

External links 

 .
 Ahmed Umer Facebook.
 A day in Ahmed Umer life, Youtube (in Norwegian).
 Ahmed Umar: Artist portrait, Youtube (in Sudanese arabic with English subtitles)

Sudanese activists
Sudanese artists
Queer artists
Gay artists
1988 births
21st-century LGBT people
Living people
Sudanese Internet celebrities
Sudanese gay actors
Sudanese LGBT artists
Sudanese contemporary artists
Sudanese painters
Non-binary artists